The Little East Branch Cupsuptic River is a short tributary of the Cupsuptic River in Maine. It flows  from its source, on the slope of West Kennebago Mountain, to its mouth on the Cupsuptic.

See also
List of rivers of Maine

References

Maine Streamflow Data from the USGS
Maine Watershed Data From Environmental Protection Agency

Tributaries of the Kennebec River
Rivers of Oxford County, Maine
Rivers of Maine